Robert S. Wittenberg (born 1981) is the Oakland County, Michigan Treasurer, since January 1, 2021. He previously represented the 27th District in the Michigan House of Representatives from 2015 to 2020.  This district comprises Berkley, Huntington Woods, Ferndale, Hazel Park, Oak Park, Pleasant Ridge, and Royal Oak Township. He is married to Kimberly and lives in Huntington Woods.

Career
Wittenberg earned a Bachelor of Science in Business Management at Indiana University and worked as a licensed insurance agent specializing in health care.

He was first elected in 2014, defeating Republican candidate Michael Ryan. During that term he was minority vice chairman of the House Financial Liability Reform Committee and served on the House Insurance and Health Policy committees.

In June 2016 Wittenberg became the founding chairperson of the Michigan Gun Violence Prevention Caucus and later that year sponsored a bill to ban assault weapons.

He re-contested the 2016 election, beating Republican challenger Kyle Forrest with a slightly increased majority. He named increasing funding for public schools as one of his priorities for the new term.

Electoral history

References

External links
Robert Wittenberg at HouseDems.com

1981 births
Living people
County treasurers in Michigan
Jewish American people in Michigan politics
Democratic Party members of the Michigan House of Representatives
People from Oak Park, Michigan
21st-century American politicians
Indiana University alumni
21st-century American Jews